"Forest Fires" is a song by English drum and bass record production duo Fred V & Grafix, featuring vocals from fellow drum and bass musician Etherwood. It was released as the second single from their debut album, Recognise, on 16 June 2014. The song reached number 77 in the UK Singles Chart after support from BBC Radio 1. The song featured twice on the Bad Education episode "Sports Day".

Track listing

Chart performance

Weekly charts

Release history

Personnel
 Fred Vahrman – producer, writer
 Josh "Grafix" Jackson – producer, writer
 Edward "Etherwood" Allen – lead vocals, writer
 Josie Radford – backing vocals
 Tom Kelsey – mastering
 Edgar Dewsbery – mastering
 Songs in the Key of Knife – publishing
 Ricky Trickartt – artwork

References

2014 singles
2014 songs
Fred V & Grafix songs